Sir Thomas Morgan, JP (7 September 1664 – 16 December 1700) was a Welsh Whig politician of the 17th century.

The eldest son of Sir William Morgan and his first wife Blanche, Morgan inherited his father's estate upon the latter's death in 1680. He married Martha Mansel, by whom he had several children, all of whom predeceased him.

Morgan entered the House of Commons in 1689 as Member of Parliament for Brecon, and was High Sheriff of Monmouthshire the same year. In 1690, he sat as MP for Monmouthshire instead, and continued to be returned there for the rest of his life. He also unseated Jeffrey Jeffreys at Brecon in 1698, who appealed on petition. Before the matter could be resolved, Morgan died of smallpox in 1700. His estates, valued at £7000, went to his brother Sir John Morgan.

References

1664 births
1700 deaths
Deaths from smallpox
Members of the Parliament of England (pre-1707) for constituencies in Wales
Whig MPs
Infectious disease deaths in Wales
High Sheriffs of Monmouthshire
English MPs 1689–1690
English MPs 1690–1695
English MPs 1695–1698
English MPs 1698–1700